

Armies

French Revolutionary Wars

Napoleonic Wars

Hundred Days

Corps

Peninsular War

Waterloo campaign

Ad-hoc divisions

Egypt (Abercromby's army)

Hanover Expedition (Cathcart's army)

Copenhagen (Cathcart's army)

Peninsular War (Dalrymple/Moore's army)

Peninsular War (Army on the Tarragona)

Martinique and Guadeloupe (Beckwith's army)

Walcheren (Chatham's army)

Semi-permanent divisions

Peninsular War (Wellington's Army)

War of the Seventh Coalition

Notes
 Footnotes

 Citations

References

 
 
 
 
 
 
 
 
 
 
 

Napoleonic Wars